Mantou, often referred to as Chinese steamed bun, is a white and soft type of steamed bread or bun popular in northern China. Folk etymology connects the name mantou to a tale about Zhuge Liang.

Description 
Mantou are typically eaten as a staple food in northern parts of China where wheat, rather than rice, is grown. They are made with milled wheat flour, water and leavening agents. As white flour, being more heavily processed, was once more expensive, white mantou were something of a luxury in preindustrial China.

Traditionally, mantou, bing, and wheat noodles were the staple carbohydrates of the northern Chinese diet, analogous to rice, which forms the mainstay of the southern Chinese diet. They are also known in the south, but are often served as street food or a restaurant dish, rather than as a staple or home cooking. Restaurant mantou are often smaller and more delicate and can be further manipulated, for example, by deep frying and dipping in sweetened condensed milk. Colors and/or flavors may be added with other ingredients from brown sugar to food coloring in mantou making, often reserved for special occasions, when they are even kneaded into various shapes in Shanxi, Shaanxi, and Shandong.

Precooked mantou are commonly sold in the frozen section of Asian supermarkets, ready for preparation by steaming or heating in the microwave oven.

A similar food, but with a savory or sweet filling inside, is baozi. Mantou is the older word, and in some regions (such as the Jiangnan region of China, and Korea) mantou (or the equivalent local reading of the word) can be used to indicate both the filled and unfilled buns, while in Japan the equivalent local reading of the Chinese word (manjū) refers only to filled buns.

Etymology and history

Mantou may have originated in the Qin State of the Zhou Dynasty during the reign of King Zhaoxiang (307 BCE – 250 BCE). During the Western Jin dynasty (265–316 CE), Shu Xi wrote about steamed cakes in his "Ode to boiled cakes", written around 300 CE. He first called them mantou. In this book, it was advised to eat this in a banquet during the approach of spring.

The Mongols are thought to have taken the filled (baozi) style of mantou to many countries of Central and East Asia about the beginning of the Yuan Dynasty in the 13th century. The name mantou is cognate to manty and mantı; these are filled dumplings in Turkish, Uzbek, (mantu) cuisines.

Folklore
A popular Chinese legend relates that the name mantou actually originated from the homophonous word 蠻頭 mántóu, which literally means "barbarian's head".

The legend was set in the Three Kingdoms Period (220–280 CE) when Zhuge Liang, the Chancellor of the state of Shu Han, led the Shu army on a campaign against Nanman forces in the southern lands of Shu, which correspond to roughly present-day Yunnan, China, and northern Myanmar.

After subduing the Nanman king Meng Huo, Zhuge Liang led the army back to Shu, but met a swift-flowing river which defied all attempts to cross it. A barbarian lord informed him that in olden days, the barbarians would sacrifice 50 men and throw their heads into the river to appease the river deity and allow them to cross. As Zhuge Liang did not want to cause any more of his men to lose their lives, he ordered his men to slaughter the livestock the army brought along, and fill their meat into buns shaped roughly like human heads (round with a flat base). The buns were then thrown into the river. After a successful crossing, he named the bun "barbarian's head" (mántóu, 蠻頭, which evolved into the modern 饅頭). Another version of the story relates back to Zhuge Liang's southern campaign when he instructed that his soldiers who had fallen sick from diarrhea and other illnesses in the swampy region be fed with steamed buns with meat or sweet fillings.

Variations in meaning outside northern China

Prior to the Song dynasty (960–1279), the word mantou meant both filled and unfilled buns. The term baozi arose in the Song dynasty to indicate filled buns only. As a result, mantou gradually came to indicate only unfilled buns in Mandarin and some varieties of Chinese.

In many areas, however, mantou still retains its meaning of filled buns. In the Jiangnan region where Wu Chinese is spoken, it usually means both filled and unfilled buns. In Shanxi, where Jin Chinese is spoken, unfilled buns are often called momo (饃饃), which is simply the character for "steamed bun". The name momo spread to Tibet and Nepal and usually now refers to filled buns or dumplings.

The name mantou is cognate to manty and mantı; these are filled dumplings in Turkish, Persian, Uzbek, and Pakistani (mantu, originated from Turko-Mongol immigrants) cuisines. In Japan, manjū (饅頭) usually indicates filled buns, which traditionally contain bean paste or minced meat-vegetable mixture (nikuman 肉まん "meat manjū"). Filled mantou are called siyopaw in Philippine, ultimately derived from Chinese shāobāo (燒包). In Thailand they serve salapao (ซาลาเปา), a filled mantou. In Korea, mandu can refer to both baozi (飽子) or jiaozi (餃子). In Mongolian cuisine, the buuz and manty or mantu are steamed dumplings, a steamed variation is said to have led to the Korean mandu. In Singapore and Malaysia, chili crab is commonly served with a fried version of mantou. In Nauru and Papua New Guinea, mantou are known as mãju.

See also

Da Bao, an extra large version of Mantou
Mantou kiln, a type of pottery kiln named after the bun
Mandarin roll
Mantı
Baozi
Manjū
Mandu
Wotou
Dampfnudel
 List of buns
 List of Chinese dishes
 List of steamed foods

References

External links
Chinese Steamed Bun 饅頭

Chinese breads
Dim sum
Steamed buns
Vegetarian dishes of China